The chapters of the Japanese manga D.Gray-man are written and illustrated by Katsura Hoshino. They began serialization in Shueisha's Weekly Shōnen Jump on May 31, 2004, and were serialized in Shueisha's monthly Jump Square manga magazine. The D.Gray-man manga series follows the adventures of Allen Walker, an Exorcist who uses the power of a divine weapon called "Innocence", and his comrades in the Black Order as they fight against the akuma, demons created from human souls by an ancient sorcerer known as the Earl of Millennium, who plans to destroy all of humanity.

Since its premiere, over two hundred chapters, referred to as "nights", have been released in Japan. The series was put on hiatus twice due to Hoshino falling ill, but the series continued a few weeks after each incident. In November 2008, Weekly Shōnen Jump announced that Hoshino was again putting the series on hold, due to an injured wrist. Publication resumed on March 9, 2009. The series once again went on hiatus starting May 11 of the same year. One chapter of the series was published in Akamaru Jump in August 2009 as the series transitioned to serialization in Jump Square, starting on November 4, 2009, but went on hiatus again on January 4, 2013. The manga began serialization again on July 17, 2015, in the quarterly published Jump SQ.Crown. Jump SQ.Crown ceased publication in January 2018, and D.Gray-man continued publication in Jump SQ.Rise.

The individual chapters are published in tankōbon by Shueisha. The first volume was released on October 9, 2004, and as of October 4, 2022, twenty-eight volumes have been released. The manga has been adapted into an anime series by TMS Entertainment and Dentsu, premiering on TV Tokyo on October 3, 2006. A sequel, D.Gray-man Hallow, premiered in July 2016.

The manga series has been licensed for an English-language release in North America by Viz Media. Viz released the first collected volume of the series on May 2, 2006, and, as of July 6, 2021, the twenty-seven current volumes have been released. Individual chapters of the series are called nights (e.g. "The 32nd Night"), and the volume name is merely a phrase at the top of the back cover. 


Volume list

Chapters not yet in tankōbon format 
The following chapters were serialized in issues of Jump SQ.Rise from January 2023 onwards, but have yet to be collected in tankōbon format.
 246.

References

External links
Official Jump Square website for the manga 
Official Viz Media website for the manga
Official website for the franchise 

D.Gray-man
D.Gray-man